Roque Gonzales can refer to:

Roque Gonzales, Rio Grande do Sul, a municipality in Rio Grande do Sul, Brazil
Roque González de Santa Cruz, a Jesuit missionary who established missions in Brazil